The Devotion of Verona to Venice was a feudal oath of loyalty made by Verona to Venice, via Veronese ambassadors to Venice, pronounced on June 24, 1405. The devotion came after the conquest of the town by Venetian troops during the War of Padua: Venice profited from internal ill-will in Verona against the Carrara rulers of Padua (and from riots in the town), allowing its army in, helped in part by the people, and forcing the Carrara to flee.

References

Bibliography
G. Solinas. Storia di Verona. Verona, Centro Rinascita, 1981.
Il primo dominio veneziano a Verona (1405-1509). Verona, Accademia di agricoltura, scienze e lettere di Verona, 1991.

15th century in the Republic of Venice
History of Verona
1405 in Europe
Oaths of allegiance